Sparto is a village and a community of the Kozani municipality. Before the 2011 local government reform it was part of the municipality of Elimeia, of which it was a municipal district. The 2011 census recorded 110 inhabitants in the community. The community of Sparto covers an area of 12.302 km2.

References

Populated places in Kozani (regional unit)